Brendan Mutimer (born 19 October 1963) is  a retired Australian rules footballer who played for North Melbourne in the Victorian Football League (VFL).

Notes

External links 
		

Living people
1963 births
Australian rules footballers from Victoria (Australia)
North Melbourne Football Club players